Sune Toft is a professor of Cosmology and Extragalactic Astrophysics at the Niels Bohr Institute. His research focuses on understanding the cosmic origin and evolution of galaxies.

Toft is married to Ingeborg Dena Taarup and has three kids, Viggo Toft, Fenja Disa Faber Toft and Keela Elena Faber Toft

Early education

Sune Toft was educated through the Danish education system, earning his bachelors degree in Physics in 1998 at the University of Copenhagen, and his masters degree in 2000, and his PhD with a thesis titled High Redshift Clusters of Galaxies in 2003, both from the Niels Bohr Institute, under the supervision of Jens Hjorth.

Scientific career
Toft is currently the Director of the Cosmic Dawn Center. He was previously at Yale University as a postdoctoral research associate with Pieter van Dokkum from 2004 to 2006, and an independent ESO fellow at the European Southern Observatory headquarters in Garching, Germany from 2007 to 2009.

References

External links 

 

21st-century Danish astronomers
Living people
Academic staff of the University of Copenhagen
Year of birth missing (living people)